The 2020 Quebec Scotties Tournament of Hearts,  the provincial women's curling championship of Quebec, was held from January 20 to 26 at the Arèna de Salaberry in Salaberry-de-Valleyfield. The winning Noémie Verreault rink represented Quebec at the 2020 Scotties Tournament of Hearts in Moose Jaw, Saskatchewan and finished with a 0–7 record. The event was held in conjunction with the 2020 Quebec Tankard, the provincial men's curling championship.

Teams
The teams are listed as follows:

Round-robin standings
Final round-robin standings

Round-robin results
All draws are listed in Eastern Time (UTC−05:00).

Draw 5
Tuesday, January 21, 8:15 am

Draw 6
Tuesday, January 21, 12:00 pm

Draw 7
Tuesday, January 21, 3:45 pm

Draw 8
Tuesday, January 21, 7:30 pm

Draw 9
Wednesday, January 22, 8:15 am

Draw 10
Wednesday, January 22, 12:00 pm

Draw 11
Wednesday, January 22, 3:45 pm

Draw 12
Wednesday, January 22, 7:30 pm

Draw 13
Thursday, January 23, 9:30 am

Draw 15
Thursday, January 23, 7:30 pm

Draw 16
Friday, January 24, 9:30 am

Draw 17
Friday, January 24, 2:30 pm

Draw 18
Friday, January 24, 7:30 pm

Tiebreaker
Saturday, January 25, 10:00 am

Playoffs

Semifinal
Saturday, January 25, 8:00 pm

Final
Sunday, January 26, 12:00 pm

References

External links
 Official site

Quebec
Curling in Quebec
Quebec Women's Provincial
Quebec Scotties Tournament of Hearts
Salaberry-de-Valleyfield